The 1921 Delaware Fightin' Blue Hens football team was an American football team that represented the University of Delaware in the 1921 college football season. In their first season under head coach Sylvester Derby, the Blue Hens compiled a 5–4 record and were outscored by a total of 187 to 163. The team played its home games at Frazer Field in Newark, Delaware.

Schedule

References

Delaware
Delaware Fightin' Blue Hens football seasons
Delaware Fightin' Blue Hens football